Shadows in the Sun is a 2009 British independent film directed by David Rocksavage and starring James Wilby, Jean Simmons, Jamie Dornan and Ophelia Lovibond.

Plot
A mysterious stranger brings together a family that has lost its way.

Hannah (Jean Simmons) is suffering from a chronic illness, smoking cannabis for respite, and has formed an unlikely friendship with a much younger man, Joe (Jamie Dornan). She lives perfectly happily with her poetry, garden and friend Joe but when Hannah's son Robert (James Wilby) arrives with his teenage daughter Kate (Ophelia Lovibond) and younger son, Sam (Toby Marlow), he is discomfited by his mother's arrangements.

Production
Set in the coastal region of north  Norfolk  the film saw the return of Jean Simmons to the screen after a decade away. It was her last film. The film is set in the 1960s and made use of locations at Walsingham, Holkham and Brancaster.

Poetry extracts heard in the film include The Rubaiyat of Omar Khayyam from a translation by Edward FitzGerald, The Character of a Happy Life by Henry Wotton,  W.B. Yeats, When You Are Old,  and Variations by Conrad Aiken.

References

External links 
 
 
 film4 shadows in the sun reviews
 primefocusgroup shadows sun giant films shadows sun giant films

2009 films
Films set in England
British drama films
2000s English-language films
2000s British films